Pachypodistes goeldii is a species of snout moth in the genus Pachypodistes. It was described by George Hampson in 1905 and is known from Brazil.

References

External links
 Pachypodistes goeldii

Moths described in 1905
Chrysauginae